Queen Sea Big Shark (Chinese: 后海大鲨鱼; Pinyin: hòuhǎi dàshāyú) is a Beijing-based Chinese indie rock band.  The group consists of lead singer Fu Han (付菡), guitarist Cao Pu (曹璞), guitarist Wang Zi (王梓), bassist Wang Jinghan (王静涵), and drummer Xiao Wu (小武).

The group formed in 2005. On how they got their name, Fu Han said: "One day we walked around Houhai (Queen Sea) Lake in Beijing, we saw a sign that read 'This is mine, don't even touch it, I'm the Houhai (Queen Sea) big shark,' then we thought, 'Wow! That's cool. Let's take it.'"

They released their debut LP in 2007 under the Modern Sky label. In 2009, they released a song and music video, entitled "Let's Play", exclusive to the Converse China website. Also, that year, they embarked on a short tour to the U.S.A. entitled "Sing for China" with other Beijing bands Hedgehog and Casino Demon.  The tour was to promote awareness for AIDS in China. They released their second album Wave in October, 2010.

After a six-year hiatus, Queen Sea Big Shark released their third album, Beijing Surfer's Adventure, in March 2016. This album incorporates many more pop and hip-hop elements than their previous albums. It was followed in 2018 by the single Superpowers (Chao Nengli 超能力).

Discography 
Albums

Non-album singles

Demos

References

External links
 Official website
 Brooklyn Vegan: Chinese indie rock bands in NYC this week
 Rock In China

Chinese musical groups
Musical groups from Beijing